Tun Tun Win (born 15 December 1987) is a footballer from Myanmar. He made his first appearance for the Myanmar national football team in 2004.

International goals

References 

1987 births
Living people
Burmese footballers
Myanmar international footballers
Association football midfielders
Southeast Asian Games silver medalists for Myanmar
Southeast Asian Games medalists in football
Competitors at the 2007 Southeast Asian Games